Dendrosenecio cheranganiensis is one of the East African giant groundsel, this one endemic to the Cherangani Hills.  Once it was a genus of Senecio but has recently been reclassified as a Dendrosenecio.

Description
Dendrosenecio cheranganiensis can grow to 6 meters tall, with trunks up to 25 centimeters in diameter and pith with diameters of 2 centimeters.  Leaf-rosettes of 40–70 leaves. Infrequent reproduction makes these giant plants sparsely branched and columnar.  They rarely exceed three reproductive cycles. Leaves can be up to 94 centimeters long and 25 centimeters wide. Inflorescence can be 100 centimeters tall and 70 centimeters in diameter. 10 to 13 ray florets 10–13 and 25 to 50 disc florets.

Distribution
D. cheranganiensis grows between 2600 and 3400 meters on the slopes of the Cherangani Hills.

Infraspecific name synonymy
The names for the giant groundsels have become somewhat confusing:
Dendrosenecio cheranganiensis (Cotton & Blakelock) E.B.Knox
Dendrosenecio cheranganiensis (Cotton & Blakelock) E.B.Knox subsp. cheranganiensis
Dendrosenecio cheranganiensis (Cotton & Blakelock) E.B.Knox subsp. cheranganiensis (2005). 
Dendrosenecio johnstonii (Oliv.) B.Nord. subsp. cheranganiensis (Cotton & Blakelock) B.Nord.  
Senecio cheranganiensis Cotton & Blakelock  
Senecio johnstonii Oliv. subsp. cheranganiensis (Cotton & Blakelock) Mabb.    
Dendrosenecio cheranganiensis (Cotton & Blakelock) E.B.Knox subsp. dalei    
Dendrosenecio cheranganiensis (Cotton & Blakelock) E.B.Knox subsp. dalei  
Dendrosenecio johnstonii (Oliv.) B.Nord. subsp. dalei (Cotton & Blakelock) B.Nord.  
Senecio dalei Cotton & Blakelock  
Senecio johnstonii Oliv. subsp. dalei (Cotton & Blakelock) Mabb.

References

External links

cheranganiensis
Endemic flora of Kenya
Afromontane flora